Campiglossa achyrophori is a species of tephritid or fruit flies in the genus Campiglossa of the family Tephritidae.

Distribution
The species is found in Sri Lanka, Taiwan.

References

Tephritinae
Insects described in 1869
Diptera of Asia